True Norwegian Black Metal may refer to:

 A phrase devised by Darkthrone
 A book on black metal by Peter Beste
 True Norwegian Black Metal (film series)
 True Norwegian Black Metal – Live in Grieghallen
 Early Norwegian black metal scene